Tomahawks Field is an outdoor athletic stadium in Tokyo, Japan, the home field of the Hosei Orange of the Kantoh Collegiate American Football Association. With permission, and assistance, from Boise State University, Hosei is the first university to have a blue turf playing surface granted to them under the first international licensing of the playing surface through a Boise State trademark.

See also
 List of college football stadiums with non-traditional field colors

References

External links
 

College football venues
American football venues in Japan
2012 establishments in Japan
Sports venues completed in 2012
American football in Japan
Sports venues in Tokyo
Hosei University